Samuel Curtis Johnson may refer to:

 Samuel Curtis Johnson, (1833–1919), founder of S. C. Johnson & Son
Samuel Curtis Johnson, Jr., (1922–2004)

See also
S. Curtis Johnson, former chairman of JohnsonDiversey
Samuel Curtis Johnson Graduate School of Management, Cornell University
Samuel Johnson (disambiguation)